Shonzhy (Chonja, Şonjy) is a selo and the administrative center of Uygur District of Almaty Region in south-eastern Kazakhstan. It is located on the A352 road.

Population 

Thermal springs in Chundzha 
The most famous thermal baths are located in the village of Chundzha, 250 km from Almaty, where the journey by car takes about 4–4.5 hours. Water in springs with a high content of radon and silicon. Water from thermal springs is used to treat various kinds of diseases, including diseases of the gastrointestinal tract and respiratory tract. According to studies carried out in 2010, the water in the springs of the Karadalinsky field in the Uygur district of the Almaty region is a medical and canteen weakly mineralized acrotherm (hypertherma) of a complex sulfate-hydrocarbonate-chloride sodium composition.

Origin of the name 
There are several versions of the origin of the name Chundzha. According to the research of the historian Daulet Kunikeev, the name of the Chundzha village is associated with the Dzungar-Kazakh battle of the 16th century.  According to him: “After the victory in the Orbulak battle since 1643, the biggest battle was the Dzungar-Kazakh battle of 1683 in the Karadal valley. The reason is that the defeat of 10,000 soldiers of the Dzungarian Chundzha by 6,000 troops under the command of Almerek batyr was an unprecedented historical victory." In this unprecedented historical victory, Almerek batyr beheaded the commander of the Eastern Seven Rivers Galdan Boshogtu, Chundzha, on a huge front. Daulet Kunikeev mentioned that this battle took place in the current village of Chundzha. Consequently, the locals began to call this vast territory "the place of Chundzha's death." Focusing on the work of the Mongolian language researcher Napil Bazylkhan, Alimgazy Dauletkhan left the following notes in the name of Chundzha: The last toponymic name of the fortress at the junction of nine roads, built by the heirs to the throne of Dschinghis Khan and monitoring the well-being of military and trade routes military (station, fire - means Lenger- Chundzha), came down to us as "Chundzha". “In modern Mongolian language occurs in the form of Conji. In the Kazakh language it is found as a toponym represented by "Шонжы". The meaning of the word "Conji" in the Mongolian language: 1. A high rock that guards from afar. 2. (figurative) Fortress; Fortification protecting the border areas”. Therefore, the word Conji translated into the Kazakh language are now used as "Chundzha" or “Шонжы”.

References

External links
Tageo.com

Populated places in Almaty Region